Mondercange is a commune in the canton of Esch-sur-Alzette in south-western Luxembourg. It derives its name from its principal town, Mondercange.  the commune has a population of 6,936 inhabitants.

, the town of Mondercange, which lies in the west of the commune, has a population of 3,532.  Other villages within the commune include Bergem, Foetz, and Pontpierre.

Population

Sports
Mondercange is home to the Luxembourg Football Federation, the governing body for football in Luxembourg.  The local football team FC Mondercange, who compete in Luxembourg's second-tier Division of Honour, play their home matches at the commune's Stade Communal.

The karting track in Modercange was used by Michael Schumacher and Jarno Trulli, amongst others, at the beginning of their racing careers owing to Luxembourg's low age restrictions for karting licences.

References

External links
 

 
Communes in Esch-sur-Alzette (canton)
Towns in Luxembourg